The Robinson High School Auditorium-Gymnasium, also known as the RHS Gym was a historic gymnasium located on the campus of Robinson High School in Robinson, Illinois. The gym was constructed in 1939 using funds granted by the Public Works Administration. The Art Deco building featured fluted columns around its entrance, glass-block windows at the entrance and east and west sides, and curved metal awnings. Both high school athletic events and public events were held in the building, as Robinson had no other large public space suitable for hosting community events at the time.

The building was added to the National Register of Historic Places in 2005. The building was demolished after the construction of a new gymnasium in 2006.  It was removed from the National Register in 2020.

Notes

Buildings and structures in Crawford County, Illinois
National Register of Historic Places in Crawford County, Illinois
Public Works Administration in Illinois
School buildings on the National Register of Historic Places in Illinois
Sports venues on the National Register of Historic Places in Illinois
1939 establishments in Illinois
Sports venues completed in 1939
Former National Register of Historic Places in Illinois